Pishakhvor (also Romanized as Pīshākhvor, Pish Akhor, and Pīshākhūr; also known as Mīshābād, Pācheh Khowr, and Pashakhūr) is a village in Bala Rokh Rural District, Jolgeh Rokh District, Torbat-e Heydarieh County, Razavi Khorasan Province, Iran. At the 2006 census, its population was 125, in 27 families.

References 

Populated places in Torbat-e Heydarieh County